Alejandro Noriega (born 9 August 1984) is an Argentine professional association footballer who plays as a forward for Talleres (RE).

Teams
 Cañuelas 2001–2004
 Tigre 2005
 San Telmo 2006–2007
 Flandria 2007–2008
 Estudiantes de Buenos Aires 2008
 Tristán Suárez 2009–2010
 Flandria 2010–2011
 Defensores de Belgrano 2011
 Deportes Concepción 2012
 Colegiales 2012 – 2013
 Club Atlético Los Andes 2013–2016
 Gimnasia y Esgrima de Jujuy 2016
 Club Atlético Douglas Haig 2017
 UAI Urquiza 2017–2018
 San Miguel 2018–2019
 Club Atlético Los Andes 2019–2021
 Talleres (RE) 2021–present

References
 
 

1984 births
Living people
Argentine footballers
Argentine expatriate footballers
Club Atlético Tigre footballers
Flandria footballers
San Telmo footballers
CSyD Tristán Suárez footballers
Estudiantes de Buenos Aires footballers
Defensores de Belgrano footballers
Deportes Concepción (Chile) footballers
Primera B de Chile players
Expatriate footballers in Chile
Association football forwards
Cañuelas footballers
Club Atlético Colegiales (Argentina) players
Club Atlético Los Andes footballers
Gimnasia y Esgrima de Jujuy footballers
Club Atlético Douglas Haig players
UAI Urquiza players
Club Atlético San Miguel footballers